Georgīĭ Vasilevich Forsten (30 May 1857 - 21 July (3 Aug.) 1910) was a Finnish historian and professor at Saint Petersburg University in Russia. He was a specialist in the history of Scandinavia and the Baltic region and one of the founders of research into Scandinavian history in Russia. Later he turned to the Reformation and the history of humanism in Germany.

Early life and education
Georgīĭ Forsten was born in Fredrikshamn (Hamina), Finland, on 30 May 1857 to a family of Swedish origin. He was a graduate of Saint Petersburg University.

Career
Forsten was a professor of Saint Petersburg University where he specialised in the history of Scandinavia and the Baltic region and was one of the founders of research into Scandinavian history in Russia. In later life his interests were in the Reformation and the history of humanism in Germany.

Death and legacy
Forsten died in Jorois, Finland, on 21 July (3 Aug.) 1910. His work was discussed by V. V. Pokhlebkinin in his article "G. V. Forsten—odin iz osnovopolozhnikov izucheniia istorii Skandinavii v Rossii" in Skandinavskii sbornik (Vol. 2, 1957) and in 1979 he was the subject of a biography by Aleksandr Sergeevič Kan titled Историк Г. В. Форстен и наука его времени (Istorik G.V. Forsten i nauka ego vremeni) that was published in Moscow.

Selected publications
 Bor’ba iz-za gospodstva na Baltiiskom more v XV i XVI stoletiiakh. Saint Petersburg, 1884.
 Baltiiskii vopros v XVI i XVII stoletiiakh (1544–1648), Vols. 1–2. Saint Petersburg, 1893–94.

References

External links
https://www.worldcat.org/identities/lccn-n86022797/
https://w.histrf.ru/articles/article/show/forstien_gieorgii_vasilievich

1857 births
1910 deaths
Historians of Scandinavia
Finnish people of Swedish descent
20th-century Finnish historians
21st-century Finnish historians
Academic staff of Saint Petersburg State University